Space Duel is an arcade game released in 1982 by Atari, Inc. It is a direct descendant of the original Asteroids, with asteroids replaced by colorful geometric shapes like cubes, diamonds, and spinning pinwheels. Space Duel is the first and only multiplayer vector game by Atari. When Asteroids Deluxe did not sell well, this game was taken off the shelf and released to moderate success.

Gameplay

The player has five buttons: two to rotate the ship left or right, one to shoot, one to activate the thruster, and one for force field. Shooting all objects on the screen completes a level. Space Duel, Asteroids, Asteroids Deluxe, and Gravitar all use similar 5-button control system.

Legacy
Space Duel is included within the Atari Anthology for Windows, Xbox, and PlayStation 2 and the PlayStation version of Atari Anniversary Edition. A port of Space Duel was released on the Atari Flashback 2, reproducing only the single-player mode.

A Space Duel cabinet is featured on the cover for The Who's 1982 album It's Hard.

There is a poster for Space Duel hanging in the bedroom of Dustin Henderson in the TV show Stranger Things. 

David Plummer holds the official world record for this game with a maximum 623,720 points.

References

External links

Space Duel at the Arcade History database
Owen Rubin's website

1982 video games
Arcade video games
Arcade-only video games
Atari arcade games
Head-to-head arcade video games
Multidirectional shooters
Vector arcade video games
Video games developed in the United States